Stranger Things Have Happened is the second studio album by British singer-songwriter Clare Maguire, released on 27 May 2016 by Virgin Records.

Track listing

Charts

References

2016 albums
Clare Maguire albums